The discography of American musical duo I Dont Know How But They Found Me consists of one studio album, three extended plays, ten singles and thirteen music videos.

Albums

Studio albums

Extended plays

Singles

Music videos

References

Discographies of American artists
Rock music discographies